The year 1501 in science and technology included many events, some of which are listed below.

Astronomy
 Nilakantha Somayaji completes his astronomical treatise Tantrasamgraha.
 Amerigo Vespucci maps the two stars Alpha Centauri and Beta Centauri, as well as the stars of the constellation Crux, which are below the horizon in Europe.

Exploration
 March 25 – Portuguese navigator João da Nova  probably discovers Ascension Island.
 November 1 (All Saints) – Amerigo Vespucci discovers and names Baía de Todos os Santos in Brazil.
 Gaspar Corte-Real makes the first known landing in North America by a Western European explorer this millennium.
 Rodrigo de Bastidas becomes the first European to explore the Isthmus of Panama.

Medicine
 Continuing until 1587, a pandemic outbreak of fever, headache, sweating and black tongue spreads through Europe. Initially called morbus Hungaricus (the Hungarian disease), it will later be regarded as an outbreak of typhus.

Births
 January 17 – Leonhart Fuchs, German botanist (died 1566)
 March 23 – Pietro Andrea Mattioli, Italian physician and botanist (died 1577)
 September 24 – Gerolamo Cardano, Italian mathematician and physician (died 1576)
 approx. date – Garcia de Orta, Portuguese Sephardi Jewish physician (died 1568)

Deaths
 presumed date – Gaspar Corte-Real, Portuguese explorer (born 1450)

References

 
16th century in science
1500s in science